Mario Cejas (born August 28, 1977 in Santa Fe) is an Argentine rower. He participated in the 2012 Summer Olympics in London where he competed in the Men's lightweight double sculls event together with his teammate Miguel Mayol. They qualified for the C finals, where they reached a fifth place, finishing in 17th place overall.

References

External links
 
 
 

1977 births
Living people
Rowers at the 2012 Summer Olympics
Argentine male rowers
Olympic rowers of Argentina
Sportspeople from Santa Fe, Argentina
Rowers at the 2011 Pan American Games
Pan American Games medalists in rowing
Pan American Games gold medalists for Argentina
South American Games gold medalists for Argentina
South American Games medalists in rowing
Competitors at the 2010 South American Games
Medalists at the 1999 Pan American Games
Rowers at the 1999 Pan American Games